ABSD-3 is an advanced base sectional dock, constructed of nine advance base dock (ABD) sections for the US Navy as an auxiliary floating drydock for World War II. ABSD-3 was delivered to the US Navy in April 1944, and was commissioned on 27 October 1944. Advance Base Sectional Dock-3 (Auxiliary Floating Dock Big-3) was constructed in sections during 1942 and 1943. 

Each section was 3,850 tons and 93 feet long. Each section had a 165 feet beam, 75 feet molded depth and 10,000 tons lifting capacity. There were four ballast compartments in each section. With all nine sections joined, she was 844 feet long and 28 feet tall (keel to welldeck), with an inside clear width of 133 feet 7 inches. ABSD-2 had a traveling 15-ton capacity crane with an 85-foot radius and two or more support barges. The two side walls were folded down under tow to reduce wind resistance and lower the center of gravity. Four of the capstans were reversible.

Construction
The nine sections that made up dock ABSD-3 were built at four different shipyards, to speed up construction:
Section A - Pollock-Stockton Shipbuilding Company in Stockton, California
Sections B & F - Everett-Pacific Shipbuilding & Dry Dock Company in Everett, Washington
Sections C & E - Chicago Bridge in Morgan City, Louisiana
Sections D, G, H & I - Pittsburgh-Des Moines Steel Co., Pittsburgh, Pennsylvania

World War II
Commissioned on 27 October 1944, the USS ABSD-3 was assigned to the Asiatic-Pacific Theater. It was towed in sections to the Naval Base Guam at Apra Harbor in Guam, Marianas Islands. After assembling she was placed in service to repair ship at Guam with ABSD-6. 

On an island in the harbor at Guam the Navy built a base to support the crew of ABSD-3 and ABSD-6. At the base were supplies, movie theater, mess hall, officers' clubs, movie theater, and enlisted club. The base was built mostly with quonset huts.

The largest repairs at Guam were that of the USS Pennsylvania near the end of World War II; the ship was hit by a kamikaze attack off Okinawa on 12 August 1945. Due to the Pennsylvanias 28.9 ft (8.8 m) draft with a full load, the battleship had to unload much of her ammunition and fuel oil before entering AFDB-3. The USS Idaho (BB-42) was also repaired in ABSD-3 after a kamikaze attack on the same day.

Able to lift 90,000 tons, ABSD-3 could raise large ships such as aircraft carriers, battleships, cruisers, and large auxiliary ships, out of the water for repair below the waterline. She was also used to repair multiple smaller ships at the same time. Ships in continuous use during war need repair both from wear and from war damage from naval mine and torpedoes. Rudders and propellers are best serviced on dry docks. Without ABSD-2 and her sister ships, at remote locations months could be lost in a ships returning to a home port for repair. ABSD-3 had power stations, ballast pumps, repair shops, and machine shops, and could be self-sustaining. ABSD-2 had two rail track moveable cranes able to lift tons of material and parts, for removing damaged parts and installing new parts.

The first ship repaired at Guam was on 5 March 1945 and the last ship on 5 March 1946, after one year of operation.

 Ships ABSD-3 repaired during World War 2:

USS Napa
LST 802
LST 822
PC 42
USS Minneapolis
LCI 544
LCI 610 
AK 142 - Cargo Ship
LST 688
LST 442
YD USS McInteze
USS Alnitah
LST 827
HM LST-421
USS LST-486
LCT 840
LCT 830 
LCT 868
LCT 846
AOD 186
USS LST-546
LST 646
LCI 890
LCI 910
USS Idaho
USS South Dakota
USS Arkansas
YNT AN-48 USS Lancewood 
YNT AN-47 USS Canotia
USS LST-1000
USS LST-767
LST 609
USS Pittsburgh
YDGT 7
SC-760 
SC-1317
YMS 403 
YMS 361 
YMS 163
AGS 14 
APC 102 s
APC 25
APC 45
USS Earle B. Hall
USS Tillman
YMS 845
AM 50
USS Rescue
AK USS Edward G. Acheson
USS Munsee
LCI 562
SC 658 
AV 4
LST 789
LSM 476
USS St. George
LST 800
LSM 208 
LCT 971
LCT 358
LCT 1182
LCT 911
LCT 912
LCT 945
LCT 817 
LCI 321
SC 677
AK SS E B
AK SS Abigail Adams
FD 188 US Army
LCT 1185
YMS 163
GS 11
LSM 439
SC 654
USS Lamar
USS Kern
LCI 1290
PC 787 
AK SS Ida Tarbell
Ak SS SS Carlos J. Finlay
LCT 803
MS 323
AN 68
YMS 275
YTB 299
YD
AU 22
LCT 1010
LCT 905
USS Pennsylvania
APA SS B. Dixon
GAGL 308 Papaw 
USS Wantuck
LCI 910
LCI 784
BCL 3068 (Concrete#42 Uranium)
YPK 3 
USS Mona Island 
YC 1132
USS Locust
YF 771 
LST 621
LST 831
USS LST-931
 LCI 461
 LCI 355
 LST 986
 LCM 184
 LCM 37
 LCM 256
 LCI 689
YF 768
APL 15 APL-2 
 LCI 817
 LCI 1064
 LCM 140
 LCM 142
FS-255
FS 229

Commanding officers
Commander Asel Bayless Kerr, USN, from 27 October 1944 to 28 December 1944
Lieutenant Commander Leo Kampman, USN, from December 1944 to 15 February 1945
Commander Asel Bayless Kerr, USN, from 15 February 1945 to 17 March 1946 
Lieutenant commander Leo Kampman, USN, from 17 March 1945 to 1 April 1946

Post-war
After the war ABSD-3 was decommissioned from the US Navy on 1 April 1946.  Some sections were laid up in the Atlantic Reserve Fleet in Green Cove Springs, Florida. Some sections were stored in the James River Reserve Fleet from 1979 to 1982.

She was struck from the Naval Register on 1 August 1981.

On 1 April 1982 eight sections were sold to Bath Iron Works in Bath, Maine. In 1982 she was towed to Portland, Maine. Bath Iron Works used the dock to lift new-built guided missile destroyers (DDG) to install sonar domes on the new ships' bows. The USS Samuel B. Roberts (FFG-58) was one of the ships serviced at the Bath Iron Works in May 1998. Bath Iron Works built a new land dry lock facility and no longer needed ABSD-3.

In 1999 she was sold and then in 2000 moved to two pieces (four sections) with the heavy-lift ship MV Blue Marlin to a shipyard in Rijeka, Croatia.

External links 
Youtube, BATTLESHIP USS IDAHO REPAIRED AT ESPIRITU SANTO in 1944 in USS Artisan (ABSD-1)1
Youtube, August 15, 1944 mighty battleship Idaho at ABSD-1
Youtube, Floating Dry Docks WWII
USS ABSD-3 crew photo with battleship Pennsylvania (BB-38) in the dock.
Photo of USS ABSD-3 engineering crew basketball team "Champs" in July 1945 at Guam
Photo USS ABSD-3 engineering crew of Section D-E-F, at Guam in July 1945. George "Bing" Crosby - 2nd left - back row
Color Photo of ABSD-3 with USS Idaho (BB-42) in drydock
Photo ABSD-3 at work in Bath Iron Works, Portland yard
Photo ABSD-3 aboard the Heavy Lift Vessel MV Blue Marlin at Portland, ME. Bath Iron Works, Portland yard

References 

World War II auxiliary ships of the United States
1944 ships
Floating drydocks of the United States Navy
Ships built by Everett-Pacific Shipbuilding & Dry Dock Company